Fantastic (stylised as FantastiC) is a 2016 South Korean television series starring Joo Sang-wook, Kim Hyun-joo, Park Si-yeon and Ji-soo. It tells the story of a successful drama writer whose life turns upside down after she discovers that she has a terminal illness and a famous actor who can't act. It aired on cable network JTBC on Fridays and Saturdays at 20:30 (KST) time slot from September 2 to October 22, 2016.

Synopsis
As a hardworking scriptwriter, So-hye (Kim Hyun-joo) is writing a drama about cancer when coincidentally she is diagnosed with breast cancer and learns she has five months left to live. She decides to live it up, leave no regrets, and do whatever she feels like doing. However, as a workaholic, she also commits to finishing her last project, then plans to leave quietly. But Hae-sung (Joo Sang-wook), a famous star, and her first love, suddenly shows up and her plans fall through. So-hye is actively opposed to casting Hae-sung as the lead in her latest drama. His stiff, robotic acting and constant nagging annoy her, and they occasionally have petty fights. But along the way, they actually seem to be falling in love. Meanwhile, Jun-gi (Kim Tae-hoon) has been by her side, both as her doctor and a friend. He knows So-hye's bright demeanor sometimes acts as a cover for her secret burden. He knows her well, and he's been through it himself. Though he can't cure her, he wants to be her steady soulmate, and face the reality together. Jun-gi and Hae-sung fight for So-hye's love, and with mixed emotions, she is indecisive. How can she decide when she only has a few months left? What is the best way to leave without regrets?

Cast

Main
 Kim Hyun-joo as Lee So-hye 
A successful scriptwriter who has her life turned into complete turmoil after discovering that she has breast cancer. She has a crush on Dr. Hong Jun-gi and gets easily annoyed at the antics of Ryu Hae-sung. But Hae-sung and So-hye have a romantic history. She is conflicted about accepting her feelings for Hae-sung because she does not want to ruin his career over a scandal. She also believes he won't be able to bear the pain of her death from cancer and hides that from him.
 Joo Sang-wook as Ryu Hae-sung 
A very successful actor in China, though he has no skills at acting. He is popular among women because of his looks and he is a little obsessed about his looks. He truly loves and cares for So-hye. He regrets his decision of betraying So-hye a decade ago and constantly tries to win her over. Although So-hye keeps rejecting him, he does not stop making attempts to woo her. He gets envious of Dr. Jun-gi as So-hye is close to him. He is funny and has childlike innocence. Later, he gets close to Dr. Jun-gi and treats him like his older brother.
 Park Si-yeon as Baek Sul 
A wife of a congressman who is living a very unhappy life. Her husband is cheating on her with another woman. Her sister-in-laws and husband constantly humiliate her and treat her like a servant. Her mother is ill and she needs money for her treatment and thus she continues to live a horrible life in exchange for money. She seeks for her young days in motorcycling to relieve the stress that she experiences from her in-laws. On one of her motorcycle ride, she gives a lift to Sang-wook and gets acquainted with him. On the encouragement from So-hye and Mi-sun, she decides to divorce her husband and put an end to her misery.
 Ji Soo as Kim Sang-wook 
A young and aspiring lawyer who has a crush on Baek Sul after a motorcycle ride with her. He works as an attorney for the company owned by Baek Sul's husband without knowing that she is married. After he sees her hurt and beaten up, he encourages her to treat herself well as she is the most important person. Later, he quits his job and represents Baek Sul as her divorce lawyer.
 Kim Tae-hoon as Dr. Hong Jun-gi
A doctor and director on whom So-hye has a crush. He has been suffering from cancer from last 5 years and is kind of an inspiration to So-hye. He deeply loves and cares for So-hye. After being rivals for So-hye, he becomes a good friend of Hae-sung.
 Kim Jung-nan as Choi Jin-sook 
She is the sister-in-law of Baek Sul and also the president of the agency to which Hae-sung belongs. She is a shrewd business women and threatens people to get her work done. After finding out that So-hye is suffering from fourth stage of cancer, she threatens her to break up with Hae-sung. She is a terrible sister-in-law and bothers Baek Sul over the series.

Supporting
 Jo Jae-yoon as Oh Chang-suk, Ryu Hae-sung's manager
 Yoon Ji-won as Hong Sang-hwa, assistant scriptwriter and good friend of Kim Sang-wook
 Kim Young-min as Choi Jin-tae, Baek Sul's husband
 Kim Jae-hwa as Jo Mi-sun, Lee So-hye and Baek Sul's friend
 Jang Joon-yoo as Jamie, Dr. Hong Jun-gi's sister
 Jung Ye-ji as (Supporting)

Ratings
In this table,  represent the lowest ratings and  represent the highest ratings.

References

External links
  
 

2016 South Korean television series debuts
2016 South Korean television series endings
South Korean romance television series
South Korean melodrama television series
Television series by AStory